Buona Sera, Mrs. Campbell is a 1968 Technicolor American comedy film starring Gina Lollobrigida, and directed by Melvin Frank, who co-wrote the original screenplay with Denis Norden and Sheldon Keller.

The United Artists release was filmed at the Cinecittà Studios in Rome. It served as the basis for the unsuccessful 1979 stage musical Carmelina. Some critics have also speculated that the 1999 stage musical Mamma Mia!—and, by extension, its 2008 film adaptation—are based on Buona Sera, Mrs. Campbell, although the musical's book writer, Catherine Johnson, has denied any connection.

Plot 
Carla "Campbell" (Gina Lollobrigida) is an Italian woman who—during the American occupation of Italy—slept with three American GIs in the course of 10 days, Cpl. Phil Newman (Phil Silvers), Lt. Justin Young (Peter Lawford), and Sgt. Walter Braddock (Telly Savalas). By the time she discovers she is pregnant, all three have moved on, and she, uncertain of which is the father, convinces each of the three (who are unaware of the existence of the other two) to support "his" daughter Gia financially.

To protect her reputation, as well as the reputation of her child, Carla has raised the girl to believe her mother is the widow of a non-existent army captain named Eddie Campbell, a name she borrowed from a can of soup (otherwise he would have been Captain Coca-Cola, the only other term she knew in English at the time).

The film opens 20 years after the end of World War II in the village of San Forino, where the three ex-airmen attend a unit-wide reunion of the 293rd Squadron of the 15th Air Force in the village where they were stationed. The men are accompanied by their wives, and in the Newmans' case, three obnoxious children. Carla is forced into a series of comic situations as she tries to keep them—each one anxious to meet his daughter Gia (Janet Margolin) for the first time—from discovering her secret while at the same time trying to keep Gia from running off to Paris to be with a much older married man who will take her to Brazil.

When confronted, Mrs. Campbell admits she does not know which of the three men is Gia's father. She challenges the men by asking them what kind of father each would have been, particularly because they have never been there for all the small but important life events of their daughter. Provoked by this, the potential fathers talk to Gia and insist that she cannot run off. The "fathers" cease the support payments, and the Braddocks, who cannot have children of their own, agree to have Gia stay with them while she studies in the U.S.

Cast 
 Gina Lollobrigida as mother Carla Campbell
 Janet Margolin as daughter Gia Campbell
 Philippe Leroy as Vittorio
 Naomi Stevens as housekeeper Rosa
 Phil Silvers as American Cpl. Phil Newman
 Shelley Winters as wife Shirley Newman
 Peter Lawford as  American Lt. Justin Young
 Marian Moses as wife Lauren Young
 Telly Savalas as Sgt. Walter Braddock
 Lee Grant as wife Fritzie Braddock
 Giovanna Galletti as The Contessa

Musical score
A soundtrack album was released by United Artists Records.

 "Buona Sera", title song
 Sung by Jimmy Roselli
 Music by Riz Ortolani
 Lyrics by Melvin Frank
 "San Forino March"
 Music and lyrics by Andrew Frank
 "The Army Air Corps Song"
 Music by Robert Crawford
 "In the Mood"
 Written by Joe Garland and Andy Razaf
 "Moonlight Serenade"
 Music by Glenn Miller

Critical response
In his review in the Chicago Sun-Times, Roger Ebert described the film as "a charming reminder of what movie comedies used to be like...It depends on the traditional strong points of movie comedy: well-defined situation, good dialog, emphasis on characters...director Melvin Frank holds the story together and makes it work. A lot of the credit goes to the real comic ability of Telly Savalas (the best of the three would-be fathers) and Shelley Winters, who plays Phil Silvers' wife. Miss Lollobrigida is good, too, projecting the kind of innocence that is necessary if the situation isn't going to seem vulgar."

In The New York Times, Howard Thompson wrote "This overcooked, hardbreathing frolic, which gets off to a bright start, eventually collapses in the category of impossible comedies, sniggeringly pegged to sex...the reasonable taste, the bounce and the logic all start floundering about midpoint, with everyone running wildly to catch up, including poor Miss Lollobrigida, who bears the brunt of the confusion and the redundant contrivances. Suddenly it's gags, gags and more gags, to no avail, until the plot peg of authentic paternity begins to sound like a tired, old burlesque joke. The finale is as dull as the opening chapter is sprightly."

Awards and nominations
 Golden Globe Award for Best Motion Picture Actress in a Musical or Comedy (Gina Lollobrigida) - nominated
 Golden Globe Award for Best Original Song ("Buona Sera, Mrs. Campbell") - nominated
 Writers Guild of America Award for Best Written American Original Screenplay - nominated
 David di Donatello for Best Actress (Gina Lollobrigida), winner

See also
 List of American films of 1968

References

External links
 
 
 
 
 

1968 films
American comedy films
1968 comedy films
United Artists films
Films set in Italy
Films directed by Melvin Frank
Films scored by Riz Ortolani
1960s English-language films
1960s American films